Aliabad-e Maleki (also Romanized as ‘Alīābād-e Māleḵī) is a village in Shusef Rural District, Shusef District, Nehbandan County, South Khorasan Province, Iran. At the 2006 census, its population was 47, in 9 families.

References 

Populated places in Nehbandan County